The Argentine presidential election of 1892 was held on 10 April to choose the president of Argentina. Luis Sáenz Peña was elected president.

Background

An 1888 massacre of a May Day gathering and an unprecedented financial crisis led to the formation of the first meaningful opposition to develop as reform movements in urban areas, culminating in the Revolution of the Park that forced Juárez Celman's 1890 resignation. These developments gathered speed when the Civic Youth Union became the Radical Civic Union (UCR), in 1891. Instability also prompted moderates from within the PAN to advance a diplomat, Roque Sáenz Peña, as the nominee. Roca foiled this move by persuading former Supreme Court Chief Justice Luis Sáenz Peña (Roque's father) to run – forcing the young reformist to withdraw. The UCR's appeal, for its part, helped lead President Carlos Pellegrini (who replaced the besieged Juárez Celman) to declare a state of siege a week before the 10 April 1892 elections. The resulting UCR electoral boycott left the ruling PAN as the only party on the ballot, handing its nominee the presidency unanimously.

Results

Results by Province

Notes

References
 
 
 
 

1892 elections in South America
1892 in Argentina
1892
Elections in Argentina